The Honda WOW (WOW stands for Wonderful Open-hearted Wagon) was a concept car created by the automobile division of Honda. The WOW was first introduced at the 2005 Tokyo Motor Show. The WOW was designed to fit the needs of both a person and their dog.

Design of the WOW
The WOW (which was built as just a design concept) was designed to fit the needs of both man and man's best friend. The WOW was built with a low center of gravity, giving the WOW a more stable driving experience. This low center of gravity allows dogs to feel more comfortable in the WOW. The WOW makes driving comfortable for dogs because it additionally features wood-paneled floors. It also sports a state-of-the-art instrument panel featuring a lid that reveals a crate to carry smaller dogs. The WOW also features average ventilation and a center walk-through, allowing dogs to walk around the car.

The Design Cues have been continued in Honda Freed which came out in 2008.

References
ConceptCarz.com Info for the Honda WOW

WOW